The Private War of Major Benson is 1955 comedy film starring Charlton Heston, Julie Adams, Sal Mineo and Tim Hovey, about a tough-talking U.S. Army officer who must shape up the JROTC program at Sheridan Academy, a Catholic boys' military academy, or be forced out of the Army.

The film was shot on St. Catherine's Military School campus in 1955, with cadets as the actors in all but the  leading roles. Universal Pictures chose St. Catherine's cadets and location for their humorous comedy about the challenges facing the new commandant of a military school by the antics of a group of grade school cadets. The picture featured a full battalion of St. Catherine's students.

The film has not been remade, but its basic premise was done twice in the following forty years, such as Hard Knox (1984) for TV and most notably with Major Payne (1995), which was also filmed by Universal Pictures.

Cast 
 Charlton Heston as Maj. Barney Benson
 Julie Adams as Dr. Kay Lambert
 William Demarest as John
 Tim Hovey as Cadet Tiger Flaherty
 Sal Mineo as Cadet Dusik
 Tim Considine as Cadet Hibler
 Nana Bryant as Mother Redempta
 Milburn Stone as General Ramsey

Reception

Screenwriters Joe Connelly and Bob Mosher were nominated for the Academy Award for Best Story.

References

External links 
 
 

1955 films
1955 comedy films
American comedy films
Films scored by Henry Mancini
Films about educators
Films directed by Jerry Hopper
Films set in California
Films set in schools
Films shot in California
Military humor in film
Universal Pictures films
Films set in boarding schools
Films with screenplays by William Roberts (screenwriter)
1950s English-language films
1950s American films